The 2000 Nordic Golf League was the second season of the Nordic Golf League, one of four third-tier tours recognised by the European Tour.

Schedule
The following table lists official events during the 2000 season.

Order of Merit
The Order of Merit was based on prize money won during the season, calculated using a points-based system.

See also
2000 Swedish Golf Tour

Notes

References

Nordic Golf League
Nordic Golf League